Senator Beck may refer to:

Audrey P. Beck (1931–1983), Connecticut State Senate
George T. Beck (1856–1943), Wyoming State Senate
James B. Beck (1822–1890), U.S. Senator from Kentucky from 1877 to 1890
Jennifer Beck (born 1967), New Jersey State Senate
John E. Beck (1869–1952), Massachusetts State Senate